Fagor was a French professional cycling team that existed from 1985 to 1989. Its main sponsor was Spanish domestic and commercial appliance manufacturer Fagor.

References

External links

Defunct cycling teams based in France
1985 establishments in France
1989 disestablishments in France
Cycling teams established in 1985
Cycling teams disestablished in 1989